Proceratophrys boiei, commonly known as Boie's frog, is a species of frog in the family Odontophrynidae. It is endemic to eastern and southeastern Brazil. This common frog is found in primary and secondary forest, on the forest edge, and in degraded areas near forest. This species is present in the illegal pet trade. Its habitat is subject to loss caused by agriculture, wood plantations, livestock grazing, clear-cutting, human settlement and tourism. The specific name boiei was given in honour of German zoologist Heinrich Boie or his brother Friedrich Boie.

Description

Both head and body are relatively broad, the snout is rounded, and long, tapering peaks of skin project from above the eyes. The surface of the skin on both back and flanks is covered with warts. The colouring is an irregular geometric pattern of brown, black, yellow, orange and red, such that the frog becomes nearly invisible against the background of leaf litter among which it lives. There is also a broad brown or grey dorsal stripe.

Ecology
Proceratophrys boiei feeds largely on insects and their larvae. An examination of the stomach contents showed that beetles constitute about 40% of the diet, with orthopterans (grasshoppers and crickets) constituting another 25%. When disturbed, Proceratophrys boiei makes a leap and then flattens itself on the leaf litter with its limbs stiff and splayed; with its skin protuberances and cryptic colouring it then closely resembles dead leaves and is likely to be overlooked by predators that hunt by sight. This stiff-legged defensive posture has now been recorded in at least seven frog species in four different families; one of these is Scythrophrys sawayae, which is also found in the forests of southeastern Brazil.

Status
This frog has a wide range and a presumed large total population. The threats it faces are likely to be as a result of such human activities as forest clearance for agriculture, plantation crops and grazing, and it is also collected for the pet trade. The International Union for Conservation of Nature has rated its conservation status as being of "least concern" as any decrease in population sizes is likely to be at too slow a rate to be sufficient to classify it in a more threatened category.

References

boiei
Amphibians of Brazil
Endemic fauna of Brazil
Amphibians described in 1824
Taxa named by Prince Maximilian of Wied-Neuwied
Taxonomy articles created by Polbot